Thomas Plunkett (1841 - March 10, 1885) was a color bearer during the American Civil War. He carried the banner of the 21st Regiment Massachusetts Volunteer Infantry at the Battle of Fredericksburg when a cannon blast took away both of his arms and wounded him in the chest. He pressed the flag against his chest with what remained of his arms and continued until one of the color guard took the flag from him so he could retire. Both of his arms were eventually amputated, and it would take another two years for him to recover. For his actions during the battle Plunkett received the Medal of Honor. Battery Plunkett, a battery of two 4-inch rapid firing guns at Fort Warren on Georges Island in Boston Harbor (MA), was completed in 1899 and named in his honor.

Medal of Honor citation

Rank and Organization:
Sergeant, Company E, 21st Massachusetts Infantry. Place and date. At Fredericksburg, Va., 11 December 1862. Entered service at: West Boylston, Mass. Birth: Ireland. Date of issue: 30 March 1866.

Citation:
Seized the colors of his regiment, the color bearer having been shot down, and bore them to the front where both his arms were carried off by a shell.

See also

List of Medal of Honor recipients
List of American Civil War Medal of Honor recipients: M–P

Notes

References

Irish-born Medal of Honor recipients
United States Army Medal of Honor recipients
Irish emigrants to the United States (before 1923)
United States Army soldiers
1841 births
1885 deaths
19th-century Irish people
Irish soldiers in the United States Army
American Civil War recipients of the Medal of Honor
Burials at Hope Cemetery (Worcester, Massachusetts)
Military personnel from County Mayo